Operation Stogie is a 1959 British film.

References

External links

1960 films
British adventure comedy films
Films shot at New Elstree Studios
1960s English-language films
1950s English-language films
Films directed by Ernest Morris
1960s British films